Rob deLeeuw (born 1975) is a Canadian actor.

Career 
His credits have included the television series Dark Angel, Big Wolf on Campus, The Business, Breaker High, and Special Unit 2. In addition, he has appeared in episodes of DaVinci's City Hall and The L Word.  He also appeared in Spotlight with Mark Ruffalo and played a Dakota Crime Boss in Season 2 of Fargo.

Filmography

Film

Television

Video games

External links

Living people
1975 births
Canadian male film actors
Canadian male television actors
20th-century Canadian male actors
21st-century Canadian male actors
Male actors from Montreal
New York University people